Persatuan Sepakbola Indonesia Karawang 1951 (simply known as Persika 1951) is a Indonesian football club based in Karawang Regency, West Java. This team competes in Liga 3 West Java Zone and their homebase is  Singaperbangsa Stadium.

History
Founded in 2022, Persika 1951 was formed because of the disappointment of supporters in the chaotic management of Persika Karawang. So on the basis of the agreement of three supporter alliances in collaboration with Association PSSI Karawang Regency then a new management was formed to navigate the 2022 Liga 3 West Java season after the merger with Persekabtas Tasikmalaya. In its first season, Persika 1951 used the name Persekabtas Persika 1951 to compete the league.

References

External links

Karawang Regency
Football clubs in Indonesia
Football clubs in West Java
2022 establishments in Indonesia
Association football clubs established in 2022
Phoenix clubs (association football)